Stefan Kuntz (born 30 October 1962) is a German professional football manager and former player who played as a striker. He is the head coach of the Turkey national team.

Kuntz represented the Germany national team between 1993 and 1997, reaching the 1994 FIFA World Cup quarter-finals and winning UEFA Euro 1996. He scored six goals from 25 full caps including in the Euro 1996 semi-final elimination of England.

Club career
Kuntz's playing career lasted from 1983 until 1999. He made 449 appearances and scored 179 goals in the Bundesliga. Kuntz played for VfL Bochum, Bayer 05 Uerdingen, 1. FC Kaiserslautern and Arminia Bielefeld and also played in Turkey for Beşiktaş J.K. In 1986 and 1994, Kuntz was the top scorer in the Bundesliga.

In 1995, Kuntz joined Turkish side Beşiktaş following request of his compatriot coach Christoph Daum. Kuntz made his 1.Lig debut on 13 August 1995 in an away game against Kayserispor that ended 1–1. On 24 September 1995, he scored his first goal at week 5 home encounter against Istanbulspor which ended 5–2.

International career
At Euro 1996, Kuntz played a key role in the 1–1 draw with England in the semi-final, scoring the equalizer soon after England took the lead, as well as scoring the fifth penalty later in the shootout. During his international career, Kuntz obtained 25 caps, scoring six goals. None of these caps ended in a defeat for Germany (20 wins, one win after penalty shootout and four draws), which is the German record for most caps without defeat.

Post-playing career
From 2006 to 2008, Kuntz was the athletic director of VfL Bochum. Between 2008 and 2016, he was the chairman of the board of 1. FC Kaiserslautern.

As coach of Germany U21 he won the UEFA European Under-21 Championship twice: in 2017, his side beat Spain 1–0 in the final, and in 2021, Germany defeated Portugal by the same scoreline.

On 19 September 2021, he was appointed as the new head coach of the Turkish national team.

Managerial statistics

Honours

Player
Kaiserslautern
 DFB-Pokal: 1989–90
 Bundesliga: 1990–91
 DFL-Supercup: 1991

Germany
 UEFA European Championship: 1996

Individual
 German Footballer of the Year: 1991

Manager
Germany U21
 UEFA European Under-21 Championship: 2017, 2021; runner-up: 2019

References

External links

 
 
 

1962 births
Living people
Sportspeople from Neunkirchen, Saarland
Footballers from Saarland
German footballers
Germany under-21 international footballers
Germany B international footballers
Germany international footballers
Association football forwards
Borussia Neunkirchen players
VfL Bochum players
KFC Uerdingen 05 players
1. FC Kaiserslautern players
Beşiktaş J.K. footballers
Arminia Bielefeld players
Bundesliga players
2. Bundesliga players
Süper Lig players
1994 FIFA World Cup players
UEFA Euro 1996 players
UEFA European Championship-winning players
Kicker-Torjägerkanone Award winners
German expatriate footballers
Expatriate footballers in Turkey
German expatriate sportspeople in Turkey
German football managers
Borussia Neunkirchen managers
Karlsruher SC managers
SV Waldhof Mannheim managers
Rot Weiss Ahlen managers
Germany national under-21 football team managers
Turkey national football team managers
German expatriate football managers
West German footballers
Expatriate football managers in Turkey